Plant life-form schemes constitute a way of classifying plants alternatively to the ordinary species-genus-family scientific classification. In colloquial speech, plants may be classified as trees, shrubs, herbs (forbs and graminoids), etc. The scientific use of life-form schemes emphasizes plant function in the ecosystem and that the same function or "adaptedness" to the environment may be achieved in a number of ways, i.e. plant species that are closely related phylogenetically may have widely different life-form, for example Adoxa moschatellina and Sambucus nigra are from the same family, but the former is a small herbaceous plant and the latter is a shrub or tree. Conversely, unrelated species may share a life-form through convergent evolution.

While taxonomic classification is concerned with the production of natural classifications (being natural understood either in philosophical basis for pre-evolutionary thinking, or phylogenetically as non-polyphyletic), plant life form classifications uses other criteria than naturalness, like morphology, physiology and ecology.

Life-form and growth-form are essentially synonymous concepts, despite attempts to restrict the meaning of growth-form to types differing in shoot architecture. Most life form schemes are concerned with vascular plants only. Plant construction types may be used in a broader sense to encompass planktophytes, benthophytes (mainly algae) and terrestrial plants.

A popular life-form scheme is the Raunkiær system.

History
One of the earliest attempts to classify the life-forms of plants and animals was made by Aristotle, whose writings are lost. His pupil, Theophrastus, in Historia Plantarum (c. 350 BC), was the first who formally recognized plant habits: trees, shrubs and herbs.

Some earlier authors (e.g., Humboldt, 1806) did classify species according to physiognomy, but were explicit about the entities being merely practical classes without any relation to plant function. A marked exception was A. P. de Candolle (1818) attempt to construct a natural system of botanical classification. His system was based on the height of the lignified stem and on plant longevity.

Eugenius Warming, in his account, is explicit about his Candollean legacy. Warming's first attempt in life-form classification was his work Om Skudbygning, Overvintring og Foryngelse (translated title "On shoot architecture, perennation and rejuvenation" - See line drawings) (1884). The classification was based on his meticulous observations while raising wild plants from seed in the Copenhagen Botanical Garden. Fourteen informal groups were recognized, based on longevity of the plant, power of vegetative propagation, duration of tillers, hypogeous or epigeous type of shoots, mode of wintering, and degree and mode of branching of rhizomes.

The term life-form was first coined by  Warming ("livsform") in his 1895 book Plantesamfund, but was translated to "growthform" in the 1909 English version Oecology of Plants.

Warming developed his life-form scheme further in his "On the life forms in the vegetable kingdom". He presented a hierarchic scheme, first dividing plants into heterotrophic and autotrophic, the latter group then into aquatic and terrestrial, the land plants into muscoid, lichenoid, lianoid and all other autonomous land plants, which again were divided into monocarpic and polycarpic. This system was incorporated into the English version of his 1895 book Oecology of Plants. Warming continued 
working on plant life-forms and intended to develop his system further. However, due to high age and illness, he was able to publish a draft of his last system only

Following Warming's line of emphasizing functional characters, Oscar Drude devised a life-form scheme in his Die Systematische und Geographische Anordnung der Phanerogamen (1887). This was, however, a hybrid between physiognomic and functional classification schemes as it recognized monocots and dicots as groups. Drude later modified his scheme in Deutschlands Pflanzengeographie (1896), and this scheme was adopted by the influential American plant ecologists Frederic Clements and Roscoe Pound

Christen C. Raunkiær's classification (1904) recognized life-forms (first called "biological types") on the basis of plant adaptation to survive the unfavorable season, be it cold or dry, that is the position of buds with respect to the soil surface. In subsequent works, he showed the correspondence between gross climate and the relative abundance of his life-forms.

 (1931) reviewed the previous life-form schemes in 1931 and strongly criticized the attempt to include "epharmonic" characters, i.e., those that can change in response to the environment (see phenotypic plasticity). He tabulated six parallel ways of life-form classification:

 1. Main life-forms ("Grundformen"): based upon the general plant physiognomy (e.g., Theophrastus, 350 BC, Humboldt, 1806;
 2. Growth-forms sensu stricto: based upon the shoot architecture;
 3. Periodicity life-forms: based upon the seasonal physiognomic variation;
 4. Bud height life-forms: based upon the height above (or below) the ground-level of the uppermost buds perduring the most unfavourable seasons (e.g., Raunkiær, 1904);
 5. Bud-type life-forms: based upon the structure of the buds perduring the most unfavourable seasons;
 6. Leaf life-forms: based on the character (form, size, duration, structure, etc.) of the leaves (e.g., Raunkiær, 1916).

Later authors have combined these or other types of unidimensional life-form schemes into more complex schemes, in which life-forms are defined as combinations of states of several characters. Examples are the schemes proposed by Pierre Dansereau and Stephan Halloy. These schemes approach the concept of plant functional type, which has recently replaced life-form in a narrow sense.

Classification systems
Following, some relevant schemes.

Theophrastus (c. 350 BC)
Based on plant habit:
 Trees
 Shrubs
 Herbs

Humboldt (1806-1808)
Humboldt described 19 (originally 16) Hauptformen, named mostly after some characteristic genus or family:
 die Palmen
 die Bananenform
 die Malvenform
 die Form der Mimosen
 die Heidekräuter
 die Cactusform
 die Orchideen
 die Form der Casuarinen
 die Nadelhölzer
 die Pothosgewächse (Arumform)
 die Lianen
 die Aloegewächse
 die Grasform
 die Farenkräuter
 die Liliengewächse
 die Weidenform
 die Myrtengewächse
 die Melastomenform
 die Lorbeerform

De Candolle (1818)
Based upon the duration of life and the height of the ligneous stem:
 1. Planta monocarpica
 2. Planta monocarpica annua
 3. Planta monocarpica biennis
 4. Planta monocarpica perennis
 5. Planta rhizocarpica
 6. Planta caulocarpica
 7. Planta caulocarpica suffrutex
 8. Planta caulocarpica frutex
 9. Planta caulocarpica arbuscula
 10. Planta caulocarpica arbor

Raunkiær (1904-1907) plant life-forms

Based on the place of the plant's growth-point (bud) during seasons with adverse conditions (cold seasons, dry seasons):
Phanerophytes
Chamaephytes
Hemicryptophytes
Cryptophyte
Geophytes
Helophytes
Hydrophytes 
Therophytes 
Aerophytes 
Epiphytes

Warming (1909)
I. Heterotrophic plants (holosaprophytes and holoparasites).
II. Aquatic plants.
Ill. Muscoid plants (bryophytes, and perhaps Hymenophyllaceae).
IV. Lichenoid plants (lichens, and perhaps some vascular plants like Tillandsia nsneoides).
V. Lianoid plants.
VI. The rest of the autonomous terrestrial plants.
A. Hapaxanthic (or monocarpic) herbs.
1. Aestival annual plants.
2. Hibernal annual plants.
3. Biennial-perennial (dicyclic, pleiocyclic) herbs.
B. Pollacanthic (polycarpic) plants.
1. Renascent (redivivus) herbs (multicipital rhizomes, mat-geophytes, and rhizome-geophytes, each of them with several subordinate groups).
2. Rosette-plants (besides the ordinary rosette-herbs and rosette-grasses also the Musa-form and the tuft-trees).
3. Creeping plants.
4. Land-plants with long erect long-lived shoots (cushion-plants, under-shrubs, soft-stemmed plants, succulent-stemmed plants, woody plants with long-lived, lignified stems, the last group divided into canopy-trees, shrubs, a dwarf-shrubs).

Clements (1920)
Vegetation-forms:
 I. 1. Annuals.
 II. 2. Biennials.
 III. Herbaceous perennials.
 3. Sod-grasses.
 4. Bunch-grasses.
 5. Bush-herbs.
 6. Cushion-herbs.
 7. Mat-herbs.
 8. Rosette-herbs.
 9. Carpet-herbs.
 10. Succulents.
 IV. Woody perennials.
 11. Halfshrubs.
 12. Bushes.
 13. Succulents.
 14. Shrubs.
 15. Trees.

Rübel (1930)
Magniligniden
Parviligniden
Semiligniden
Sukkulenten
Epiphyten
Lianen
Herbiden
Saxiden
Errantiden

Du Rietz (1931)
Main life-forms ("Grundformen") system:
A. Woody plants or Holoxyles ("ligneous plants", "lignose" of many earlier authors, "Ligniden" Du Rietz 1921, "Xyloids" Warming 1923).
I. Trees.
II. Shrubs. 
III. Dwarf-shrubs. 
IV. Woody cushion-plants.
V. Woody lianas. 
B. Half-shrubs, or Hemixyles (semi-woody plants, "Semiligniden" Rübel 1930).
I. Tall half-shrubs.
II. Dwarf half-shrubs. 
C. Herbaceous plants ("Herbiden" Du Rietz 1921).
I. Chtonophytic, non-lianoid. 
II. Epiphytoidic.
III. Parasitic on trunks or branches of trees, shrubs, or dwarf-shrubs.
IV. Herbaceous lianes.

Growth-form system:
 a. Main stem-types in flowering-plants.
 A. Geocorms.
 I. Plagiogeocorms.
 II. Orthooeocorms.
 B. Aërocorms.
 I. Herbaceous aërocorms. 
 II. Ligneous aerocorrns. 
 b. Growth-forms on the basis of stem-types and stem-type combinations.
 A. Holoxyles
 I. Trees.
 II. Shrubs.
 III. Dwarf-shrubs.
 IV. Woody Cushion-plants. 
 B. Hemixyles.
 I. True Half-shrubs (suffrutices).
 II. Cane Half-shrubs (virgulta).

Ellenberg & Mueller-Dombois (1967)
Main groups of plant life forms:
 Aa Autotrophic plants
 Ba Kormophytes (= vascular plants)
 Ca Self-supporting plants
 Da Woody plants, or herbaceous evergreen perennials
 Phanerophytes
 Chamaephytes
 Db Perennial (including biennial) herbaceous plants with periodic shoot reduction
 Hemicryptophytes
 Geophytes (Cryptophytes)
 Dc Annuals
 Therophytes
 Cb Plants that grow by supporting themselves on others
 Ea Plants that root in the ground
 Lianas (Eu-lianas)
 Hemi-epiphytes (Pseudo-lianas)
 Eb Plants that germinate and root on other plants (these include dead standing plants, telegraph poles and wires, stumps and such like)
 Epiphytes
 Cc Free-moving water plants (= errants)
 Errant vascular Hydrophytes
 Bb Thallophytes (= non-vascular cryptogams)
 Fa Plants attached to the ground surface
 Ga Perennials
 Thallo-chamaephytes
 Thallo-hemicryptophytes
 Gb Annuals
 Thallo-therophytes
 Fb Fb Plants attached to others
 Thallo-epiphytes
 Fc Free-moving autotrophic thallophytes (= errants)
 Ha Photosynthesizers
 Errant thallo-hydrophytes
 Kryophytes
 Edaphophytes
 Hb Chemosynthesizers
 Chemo-edaphophytes
 Ab Semi-autotrophic plants
 Ia Kormophytes
 Vascular Semi-parasites
 Ib Thallophytes
 Thallo-semi-parasites
 Ac Heterotrophic plants
 Ka Kormophytes
 Vascular Parasites
 Vascular Saprophytes
 Kb Thallophytes
 Thallo-parasites
Thallo-saprophytes

Other categorizations 
Following, other morphological, ecological, physiological or economic categorizations of plants. According to the general appearance (habit):
Woody plants
Trees
Shrubs
subshrubs 
Lianas
Herbaceous plants
graminoids
 Other: vines (lianas and nonwoody vines), cushion plants and rosettes, canes, palm-like plants (see Glossary of plant morphology#Plant habit)

According to leaf hardness, size and orientation in relation to sunlight:
 Sclerophyll leaves
 Orthophyll or hyptiophyll leaves

According to the habitat:
Terrestrial plants
Aquatic (hydrophytes or macrophytes)
Aerial plants (epiphytes)
Lithophytes

According to the water content of the environment:
 Aquatic plants (hydrophytes)
 Marsh plants (helophytes)
 Moisture plants (hygrophytes)
 Drought plants (xerophytes)
 Mesophytes
 Phreatophytes

According to latitude (in vegetation classification):
 Tropical
 Subtropical
 Temperate
 Subpolar
 Polar

According to climate (in vegetation classification):
 Pluvial (ombrophilous)
 Seasonal
 Drought 
 Cloud forest
 Rainforest

According to altitude (in vegetation classification):
 Montane
 Submontane
 Lowland

According to the loss of leaves (in vegetation classification):
 Deciduous (caducifolious)
 Semi-deciduous (semicaducifolious)
 Evergreen (perennifolious)

According to the luminosity of the environment:
 Heliophytes
 Sciophytes (embryophytes)

According to the mode of nutrition:
 Parasite plants 
 Hemiparasites
 Carnivorous plants
 Mycotrophs

According to soil factors:
 Metallophytes
 Halophytes
 Glycophytes

According to the capacity to avoid dehydration:
 Poikilohydric plants
 Homoiohydric plants

According to short-term fluctuations in water balance:
 Hydrolabile plants
 Hydrostable plants

According to the range of drought/humidity tolerance:
 Stenohydric plants
 Euryhydric plants

According to longevity:
 Annual plants 
 Biennial plants
 Perennial plants

According to the type of photosynthesis:
 C3 plants
 C4 plants
 CAM plants

According to origin:
 Exotic plants
 Native plants
 Naturalised or subspontaneous plants

According to biogeographic distribution:
 Endemic plants
 Cosmopolitan plants
 Disjunct plants

According to invasiveness:
 Invasive plant 
 Noninvasive plant

According to establishment time in an ecological succession:
 Pioneer plants or ruderal plants
 Climax plants

According to human cultivation:
 Domesticated plants 
 Cultigens
 Wild plants

According to importance to humans (see ethnobotany):
 Edible plants
 Medicinal plants
 Ornamental plants
 Timber trees
 Indicator plants
 Weeds
 Poisonous plants

See also
 Succulent plants

References

External links

 Pillar, V.D. & L. Orlóci. 2004. Character-Based Community Analysis: The Theory and an Application Program. Electronic Edition available at http://ecoqua.ecologia.ufrgs.br. 213 p., .

 
Ecology